Bartholomew Jojo "Bart" Simpson is a fictional character in the American animated television series The Simpsons and part of the Simpson family. He is voiced by Nancy Cartwright and first appeared on television in The Tracey Ullman Show short "Good Night" on April 19, 1987. Cartoonist Matt Groening created and designed Bart while waiting in the lobby of James L. Brooks' office. Groening had been called to pitch a series of shorts based on his comic strip, Life in Hell, but instead decided to create a new set of characters. While the rest of the characters were named after Groening's family members, Bart's name is an anagram of the word brat. After appearing on The Tracey Ullman Show for two years, the Simpson family received its own series on Fox, which debuted December 17, 1989. Bart has appeared in every Simpsons episode except "Four Great Women and a Manicure".

At ten years old, Bart is the eldest child and only son of Homer and Marge, and the brother of Lisa and Maggie. Bart's most prominent and popular character traits are his mischievousness, rebelliousness and disrespect for authority. Hallmarks of the character include his chalkboard gags in the opening sequence; his prank calls to Moe; and his catchphrases "Eat my shorts", "¡Ay, caramba!", "Don't have a cow, man!", and "I'm Bart Simpson. Who the hell are you?" However, with the exception of "¡Ay, caramba!", these hallmarks have been retired or are not often used. Bart has appeared in other media relating to The Simpsons – including video games, The Simpsons Movie, The Simpsons Ride, commercials, and comic books – and inspired an entire line of merchandise.

In casting, Cartwright originally planned to audition for the role of Lisa, while Yeardley Smith tried out for Bart. Smith's voice was considered too high for a boy, so she was given the role of Lisa. Cartwright found Lisa uninteresting, so she instead auditioned for Bart, which she thought was a better role.

During the first two seasons of The Simpsons, Bart was the show's protagonist and "Bartmania" ensued, spawning Bart Simpson-themed merchandise touting his rebellious attitude and pride at underachieving, which caused many parents and educators to cast him as a bad role model for children. Around the third season, the role of the protagonist was taken over by his father, and series started to focus more on the family as a whole, though Bart still remains a prominent breakout character. Time named Bart one of the 100 most important people of the 20th century, and he was named "entertainer of the year" in 1990 by Entertainment Weekly. Cartwright has won several awards for voicing Bart, including a Primetime Emmy Award in 1992 and an Annie Award in 1995. In 2000, Bart, along with the rest of his family, was awarded a star on the Hollywood Walk of Fame.

Role in The Simpsons
The Simpsons uses a floating timeline in which the characters do not age or age very little, and as such, the show is always assumed to be set in the current year. In several episodes, events have been linked to specific times, though sometimes this timeline has been contradicted in subsequent episodes. Bart's year of birth was stated in "I Married Marge" (season three, 1991) as being in the early 1980s. In "Simpsorama" (season 26, 2014) Bart states his birthday as February 23. He lived with his parents in the Lower East Side of Springfield until the Simpsons bought their first house. When Lisa was born, Bart was at first jealous of the attention she received, but he soon warmed to her when he discovered that "Bart" was her first word. Bart's first day of school was in the early 1990s. His initial enthusiasm was crushed by an uncaring teacher and Marge became worried that something was truly wrong with Bart. One day during recess, Bart met Milhouse and started entertaining him and other students with various gestures and rude words. Principal Skinner told him "you've just started school, and the path you choose now may be the one you follow for the rest of your life! Now, what do you say?" In his moment of truth, Bart responded, "eat my shorts". The episode "That '90s Show" (season nineteen, 2008) contradicted much of the backstory's time frame; for example, it was revealed that Homer and Marge were childless in the early 1990s.

Bart's hobbies include skateboarding, watching television (especially The Krusty the Clown Show which includes The Itchy & Scratchy Show), reading comic books (especially Radioactive Man), playing video games and generally causing mischief. His favorite movies are Jaws and the Star Wars Trilogy. For the duration of the series, Bart has attended Springfield Elementary School and has been in Edna Krabappel's fourth grade class. While he is too young to hold a full-time job, he has had occasional part-time jobs. He works as a bartender at Fat Tony's social club in "Bart the Murderer" (season three, 1991); as Krusty the Clown's assistant in "Bart Gets Famous" (season five, 1994); as a doorman in Springfield's burlesque house, the Maison Derrière, in "Bart After Dark" (season eight, 1996); and briefly owns his own factory in "Homer's Enemy" (season eight, 1997).

Character

Creation

Matt Groening first conceived of Bart and the rest of the Simpson family in 1987, while waiting in the lobby of producer James L. Brooks' office. Groening had been called in to pitch a series of animated shorts for The Tracey Ullman Show, and had intended to present an adaptation of his Life in Hell comic strip. When he realized that animating Life in Hell would require him to rescind publication rights, Groening decided to go in another direction. He hurriedly sketched out his version of a dysfunctional family, naming the characters after members of his own family. For the rebellious son, he substituted "Bart", an anagram of the word brat, for his own name, as he decided it would have been too obvious for him to have named the character 'Matt'. Bart's middle initial J is a "tribute" to animated characters such as Bullwinkle J. Moose and Rocket J. Squirrel from The Rocky and Bullwinkle Show, who received their middle initial from Jay Ward. According to the book Bart Simpson's Guide to Life, Bart's full middle name is "JoJo".

Bart had originally been envisioned as "a much milder, troubled youth given to existential angst who talks to himself", but the character was changed based on Cartwright's voice acting. Groening has credited several different figures with providing inspiration for Bart: Matt Groening's older brother Mark provided much of the motivation for Bart's attitude. Bart was conceived as an extreme version of the typical misbehaving child character, merging all of the extreme traits of characters such as Tom Sawyer and Huckleberry Finn into one person. Groening describes Bart as "what would happen if the son of Eddie Haskell [from Leave It to Beaver] got his own show". Groening has also said that he found the premise of Dennis the Menace disappointing and was inspired to create a character who was actually a menace.

Bart made his debut with the rest of the Simpson family on April 19, 1987, in The Tracey Ullman Show short "Good Night". In 1989, the shorts were adapted into The Simpsons, a half-hour series airing on the Fox Broadcasting Company. Bart and the Simpson family remained the main characters on this new show.

Design

The entire Simpson family was designed so that they would be recognizable in silhouette. The family was crudely drawn, because Groening had submitted basic sketches to the animators, assuming they would clean them up; instead, they just traced over his drawings. Bart's original design, which appeared in the first shorts, had spikier hair, and the spikes were of different lengths. The number was later limited to nine spikes, all of the same size. At the time Groening was primarily drawing in black and "not thinking that [Bart] would eventually be drawn in color" gave him spikes which appear to be an extension of his head. The features of Bart's character design are generally not used in other characters; for example, no other characters in current episodes have Bart's spiky hairline, although several background characters in the first few seasons shared the trait.

The basic rectangular shape of Bart's head is described by director Mark Kirkland as a coffee can. Homer's head is also rectangular (with a dome on top), while spheres are used for Marge, Lisa, and Maggie. Different animators have different methods of drawing Bart. Former director Jeffrey Lynch starts off with a box, then adds the eyes, then the mouth, then the hair spikes, ear, and then the rest of the body. Matt Groening normally starts with the eyes, then the nose, and the rest of the outline of Bart's head. Many of the animators have trouble drawing Bart's spikes evenly; one trick they use is to draw one on the right, one on the left, one in the middle, then continue to add one in the middle of the blank space until there are nine. Originally, whenever Bart was to be drawn from an angle looking down so the top of his head was seen, Groening wanted there to be spikes along the outline of his head, and in the middle as well. Instead, Wes Archer and David Silverman drew him so that there was an outline of the spikes, then just a smooth patch in the middle because "it worked graphically". In "The Blue and the Gray", Bart (along with Lisa and Maggie) finally questions why his hair has no visible border to separate head from hair.

In the season seven (1995) episode "Treehouse of Horror VI", Bart (along with Homer) was computer animated into a three-dimensional character for the first time for the "Homer3" segment of the episode. The computer animation was provided by Pacific Data Images. While designing the 3D model of the character, the animators did not know how they would show Bart's hair. They realized that there were vinyl Bart dolls in production and purchased one to use as a model.

Voice

Bart's voice is provided by Nancy Cartwright, who voices several other child characters on The Simpsons, including Nelson Muntz, Ralph Wiggum, Todd Flanders, and Kearney. While the roles of Homer and Marge were given to Dan Castellaneta and Julie Kavner because they were already a part of The Tracey Ullman Show cast, the producers decided to hold casting for the roles of Bart and Lisa. Yeardley Smith had initially been asked to audition for the role of Bart, but casting director Bonita Pietila believed her voice was too high. Smith later recalled, "I always sounded too much like a girl. I read two lines as Bart and they said, 'Thanks for coming! Smith was given the role of Lisa instead. On March 13, 1987, Nancy Cartwright went in to audition for the role of Lisa. After arriving at the audition, she found that Lisa was simply described as the "middle child" and at the time did not have much personality. Cartwright became more interested in the role of Bart, who was described as "devious, underachieving, school-hating, irreverent, [and] clever". Matt Groening let her try out for the part instead, and upon hearing her read, gave her the job on the spot. Cartwright is the only one of the six main Simpsons cast members who had been professionally trained in voice acting prior to working on the show.

Cartwright's normal speaking voice is said to have "no obvious traces of Bart". The voice came naturally to Cartwright; prior to The Tracey Ullman Show, she had used elements of it in shows such as My Little Pony, Snorks, and Pound Puppies. Cartwright describes Bart's voice as easy to perform, saying, "Some characters take a little bit more effort, upper respiratory control, whatever it is technically. But Bart is easy to do. I can just slip into that without difficulty." She usually does five or six readings of every line in order to give the producers more to work with. In flashforward episodes, Cartwright still provides the voice of Bart. For "Lisa's Wedding" (season six, 1995), Bart's voice was electronically lowered.

Despite Bart's fame, Cartwright is rarely recognized in public. When she is recognized and asked to perform Bart's voice in front of children, Cartwright refuses as it "freaks [them] out". During the first season of The Simpsons, the Fox Network did not allow Cartwright to give interviews because they did not want to publicize that Bart was voiced by a woman.

Until 1998, Cartwright was paid $30,000 per episode. During a pay dispute in 1998, Fox threatened to replace the six main voice actors with new actors, going as far as preparing for casting of new voices. The dispute was resolved and Cartwright received $125,000 per episode until 2004, when the voice actors demanded that they be paid $360,000 an episode. The dispute was resolved a month later, and Cartwright's pay rose to $250,000 per episode. After salary renegotiations in 2008, the voice actors received approximately $400,000 per episode. Three years later, with Fox threatening to cancel the series unless production costs were cut, Cartwright and the other cast members accepted a 30 percent pay cut to just over $300,000 per episode.

Hallmarks
In the opening sequence of many Simpsons episodes, the camera zooms in on Springfield Elementary School, where Bart can be seen writing lines on the chalkboard. The sentences, which changes from episode to episode, has become known as the "chalkboard gag". Chalkboard messages may involve political humor such as "The First Amendment does not cover burping", pop culture references such as "I can't see dead people", and meta-references such as "I am not a 32-year-old woman" and "Nobody reads these anymore". The animators are able to produce the chalkboard gags quickly and in some cases have changed them to fit current events. For example, the chalkboard gag for "Homer the Heretic" (season four, 1992) read, "I will not defame New Orleans." The gag had been written as an apology to the city for a controversial song in the previous week's episode, "A Streetcar Named Marge", which called the city a "home of pirates, drunks and whores". Many episodes do not feature a chalkboard gag because a shorter opening title sequence, where the chalkboard gags are cut, is used to make more room for story and plot development.

One of Bart's early hallmarks were his prank calls to Moe's Tavern owner Moe Szyslak in which Bart calls Moe and asks for a gag name. Moe tries to find that person in the bar, but rapidly realizes it is a prank call and (despite not knowing who actually made the call) angrily threatens Bart. These calls were based on a series of prank calls known as the Tube Bar recordings. Moe was based partly on Tube Bar owner Louis "Red" Deutsch, whose often profane responses inspired Moe's violent side. The prank calls debuted in "Homer's Odyssey" (season one, 1990), the third episode to air, but were included in "Some Enchanted Evening", the first episode of the series that was produced. As the series progressed, it became more difficult for the writers to come up with a fake name and to write Moe's angry response, so the pranks were dropped as a regular joke during the fourth season but they have occasionally resurfaced on the show.

The catchphrase "Eat My Shorts" was an ad-lib by Cartwright in one of the original table readings, harking back to an incident when she was in high school. Cartwright was in the marching band at Fairmont High School, and one day while performing, the band chanted "Eat my shorts" rather than the usual "Fairmont West! Fairmont West!" It could also be an homage to The Breakfast Club, as John Bender says the phrase to Principal Vernon. John Bender would become the inspiration for another Matt Groening creation, Bender from Futurama. Bart's other catchphrases, "¡Ay, caramba!" came from a Portuguese flamenco dancer and "Don't have a cow!" had been around since the 1950s which derived from the British phrase "Don't have kittens"; both were featured on T-shirts manufactured during the production of the early seasons of The Simpsons. "Cowabunga" is also commonly associated with Bart, although it was mostly used on the show after it had been used as a slogan on the T-shirts. Reiss also stated the writers took the phrase from Chief Thunderthud on The Howdy Doody Show. The use of catchphrase-based humor was mocked in the episode "Bart Gets Famous" (season five, 1994) in which Bart lands a popular role on Krusty the Clown's show for saying the line "I didn't do it." The writers chose the phrase "I didn't do it" because they wanted a "lousy" phrase "to point out how really crummy things can become really popular".

Bart commonly appears nude in the show, although in every case only his buttocks are visible. In The Simpsons Movie (2007), Bart appears in a sequence where he is skateboarding while fully nude; several different items cover his genitalia, but for a brief moment his penis can be seen. The scene was one of the first worked on for the film, but the producers were nervous about the segment because they thought it would earn the movie an R rating. Despite this, the film was rated PG-13 by the Motion Picture Association of America for "Irreverent Humor Throughout". The scene was later included by Entertainment Weekly in their list of "30 Unforgettable Nude Scenes".

Personality

Bart's character traits of rebelliousness and disrespect for authority have been compared to that of America's founding fathers, and he has been described as an updated version of Tom Sawyer and Huckleberry Finn, rolled into one. In his book Planet Simpson, Chris Turner describes Bart as a nihilist, a philosophical position that argues that existence is without objective meaning, purpose, or intrinsic value.

Bart's rebellious attitude has made him a disruptive student at Springfield Elementary School, where he is an underachiever and proud of it. He is constantly at odds with his teacher Ms. Krabappel, Principal Skinner, and occasionally Groundskeeper Willie. Bart does poorly in school and is well aware of it, having once declared, "I am dumb, okay? Dumb as a post! Think I'm happy about it?" On one occasion, Lisa successfully proves that Bart is dumber than a hamster, although Bart ultimately outsmarts her. Bart's thoughts are often illogical; he once thought if he died and reincarnated as a butterfly, he would be able to burn the school down without being suspected, thinking that he would be able to hold a gas can as a butterfly. He has also thought if he wrote his name in wet cement, people who see it after it dries will wonder how he managed to write his name in solid cement. In "Separate Vocations" (season three, 1992), Bart becomes hall monitor and his grades go up, suggesting that he struggles mainly because he does not pay attention, not because he is stupid. This idea is reinforced in "Brother's Little Helper" (season eleven, 1999), in which it is revealed that Bart has attention deficit disorder. His lack of smarts can also be attributed to the hereditary "Simpson Gene", which affects the intelligence of most male members of the Simpson family. Although he gets into endless trouble and can be sadistic, shallow and selfish, Bart also exhibits many qualities of high integrity. He has, on a few occasions, helped Principal Skinner and Mrs. Krabappel: In "Sweet Seymour Skinner's Baadasssss Song" (season five, 1994), Bart accidentally got Skinner fired and befriended him outside the school environment. Bart missed having Skinner as an adversary and got him rehired, knowing that this would mean that the two could no longer be friends.

Due to Bart's mischievousness and Homer's often uncaring and incompetent behavior, the two have a turbulent, jaded, violent, and at times borderline sadistic relationship. Bart regularly addresses Homer by his first name instead of "Dad", while Homer in turn often refers to him as "the boy". Homer has a short temper and when enraged by Bart will strangle him on impulse in a cartoonishly violent manner. One of the original ideas for the show was that Homer would be "very angry" and oppressive toward Bart, but these characteristics were toned down somewhat as their characters were explored. Marge is a much more caring, understanding and nurturing parent than Homer, but she also refers to Bart as "a handful" and is often embarrassed by his antics. In "Marge Be Not Proud" (season seven, 1995), she felt she was mothering Bart too much and began acting more distant towards him after he was caught shoplifting. At the beginning of the episode, Bart protested at her over-mothering but as her attitude changed, he felt bad and made it up to her. Despite his attitude, Bart is sometimes willing to experience humiliation if it means pleasing his mom. Marge has expressed an understanding for her "special little guy" and has defended him on many occasions. She once said "I know Bart can be a handful, but I also know what he's like inside. He's got a spark. It's not a bad thing ... Of course, it makes him do bad things."

Bart shares a sibling rivalry with his younger sister, Lisa, but has a buddy-like relationship with his youngest sister Maggie, due to her infant state. While Bart has often hurt Lisa, and even fought her physically, the two are often very close. Bart cares for Lisa deeply and has always apologized for going too far. He also believes Lisa to be his superior when it comes to solving problems and frequently goes to her for advice. Bart is also highly protective of Lisa: When a bully destroys her box of cupcakes in "Bart the General" (season one, 1990), Bart immediately stands up for her.

Bart is portrayed as a popular cool boy and has many friends at school. Out of all of them his best friend is Milhouse Van Houten, although Bart has at times shown embarrassment about their friendship. Bart is a bad influence on Milhouse, and the two have been involved in a lot of mischief together. Because of this behavior, Milhouse's mother forbids Milhouse from playing with Bart in "Homer Defined" (season three, 1991). While at first he pretended that he did not care, Bart eventually realizes that he needs Milhouse, and Marge manages to convince Mrs. Van Houten to reconsider. Milhouse is a frequent target for local bullies Nelson Muntz and his friends Jimbo, Dolph, and Kearney. At times, Bart also finds himself at the hands of their abuse. Despite being the more socially powerful of the two, Bart's social popularity has temporarily subsided various episodes either due to extreme embarrassment caused by his family or other people (or even himself) or an unfortunate coincidence. Milhouse describes their social standing as "Three and a half. We get beat up, but we get an explanation." While Bart and the bullies have been adversaries at times, with Bart once declaring war on Nelson, the school bullies actually like Bart for his ways and hang out with him at times, especially Nelson who eventually becomes close friends with him.

Bart is one of the biggest fans of children's television host Krusty the Clown. He once declared, "I've based my whole life on Krusty's teachings", and sleeps in a room filled with Krusty merchandise. He has helped the clown on many occasions, for example, foiling Sideshow Bob's attempt to frame Krusty for armed robbery in "Krusty Gets Busted" (season one, 1990), reuniting Krusty with his estranged father in "Like Father, Like Clown". and helping Krusty return to the air with a comeback special and reignite his career in "Krusty Gets Kancelled". For his part, Krusty has remained largely ignorant of Bart's help and treats Bart with disinterest. One summer, Bart enthusiastically attended Kamp Krusty, which turned out to be a disaster, with Krusty nowhere to be seen. Bart keeps his hopes up by believing that Krusty would show up, but is soon pushed over the edge, and finally decides that he is sick of Krusty's shoddy merchandise and takes over the camp. Krusty immediately visits the camp in hopes of ending the conflict and manages to appease Bart. One of the original ideas for the series was that Bart worshiped a television clown but had no respect for his father, although this was never directly explored. Because of this original plan, Krusty's design is basically Homer in clown make-up. When Bart foiled Sideshow Bob's plans in "Krusty Gets Busted", it sparked a long-standing feud between the two. The writers decided to have Bob repeatedly return to get revenge on Bart. They took the idea of the Coyote chasing the Road Runner and depicted Bob as an intelligent person obsessed with catching a bratty boy. Bob has appeared in fourteen episodes, generally plotting various evil schemes which often have to do with getting revenge on Bart (and sometimes the entire Simpson family by proxy), but is always foiled in the end.

Reception and cultural influence

Bartmania
In 1990, Bart quickly became one of the most popular characters on television in what was termed "Bartmania". He became the most prevalent Simpsons character on memorabilia, such as T-shirts. In the early 1990s, millions of T-shirts featuring Bart were sold; as many as one million were sold on some days. Believing Bart to be a bad role model, several American public schools banned T-shirts featuring Bart next to captions such as "I'm Bart Simpson. Who the hell are you?" and "Underachiever ('And proud of it, man!')". The Simpsons merchandise sold well and generated $2 billion in revenue during the first 14 months of sales. The success of Bart Simpson merchandise inspired an entire line of black market counterfeit items, especially T-shirts. Some featured Bart announcing various slogans, others depicted redesigns of the character, including "Teenage Mutant Ninja Bart, Air Simpson Bart, [and] RastaBart". Matt Groening generally did not object to bootleg merchandise, but took exception to a series of "Nazi Bart" shirts which depicted Bart in Nazi uniform or as a white power skinhead. 20th Century Fox sued the creator of the shirts, who eventually agreed to stop making them.

Bart became so associated with Fox that, when bidding in 1993 to show pro football, the network had to assure the NFL and reporters that the character would not announce games. Due to the show's success, over the summer of 1990 Fox decided to switch The Simpsons timeslot so that it would move from 8:00 p.m. ET on Sunday night to the same time on Thursday, where it would compete with The Cosby Show on NBC, the number one show at the time. Through the summer, several news outlets published stories about the supposed "Bill vs. Bart" rivalry. The August 31, 1990 issue of Entertainment Weekly featured a picture of Bill Cosby wearing a Bart Simpson T-shirt. "Bart Gets an 'F' (season two, 1990) was the first episode to air against The Cosby Show, and it received a lower Nielsen rating, tying for eighth behind The Cosby Show, which had an 18.5 rating. The rating is based on the number of household televisions that were tuned into the show, but Nielsen Media Research estimated that 33.6 million viewers watched the episode, making it the number one show in terms of actual viewers that week. At the time, it was the most watched episode in the history of the Fox Network, and it is still the highest rated episode in the history of The Simpsons. Because of his popularity, Bart was often the most promoted member of the Simpson family in advertisements for the show, even for episodes in which he was not involved in the main plot.

Bart was described as "television's king of 1990", "television's brightest new star" and an "undiminished smash". Entertainment Weekly named Bart the "entertainer of the year" for 1990, writing that "Bart has proved to be a rebel who's also a good kid, a terror who's easily terrorized, and a flake who astonishes us, and himself, with serious displays of fortitude." In the United States congressional, senatorial and gubernatorial elections of 1990, Bart was one of the most popular write-in candidates, and in many areas was second only to Mickey Mouse amongst fictional characters. In the 1990 Macy's Thanksgiving Day Parade, Bart made his debut as one of the giant helium-filled balloons for which the parade is known. The Bart Simpson balloon has appeared at every parade since. This was referenced in The Simpsons in the episode "Bart vs. Thanksgiving", which aired the same day as the parade, where Homer tells Bart, "If you start building a balloon for every flash-in-the-pan cartoon character, you turn the parade into a farce!" Meanwhile, behind and unbeknownst to him, the television briefly shows a Bart Simpson balloon.

The album The Simpsons Sing the Blues was released in September 1990 and was a success, peaking at No. 3 on the Billboard 200 and becoming certified 2× platinum by the Recording Industry Association of America. The first single from the album was the pop rap song "Do the Bartman", performed by Nancy Cartwright and released on November 20, 1990. The song was written by Bryan Loren, a friend of Michael Jackson. Jackson was a fan of The Simpsons, especially Bart, and had called the producers one night offering to write Bart a number one single and do a guest spot on the show. Jackson eventually guest starred in the episode "Stark Raving Dad" (season three, 1991) under the pseudonym John Jay Smith. While the song was never officially released as a single in the United States, it was successful in the United Kingdom. In 1991 it was the number one song in the UK for three weeks from February 16 to March 9 and was the seventh best-selling song of the year. It sold half a million copies and was certified gold by the British Phonographic Industry on February 1, 1991.

Bart as a role model

Bart's rebellious nature, which frequently resulted in no punishment for his misbehavior, led some parents and conservatives to characterize him as a poor role model for children. Robert Bianco of the Pittsburgh Post-Gazette wrote that "[Bart] outwits his parents and outtalks his teachers; in short, he's the child we wish we'd been, and fear our children will become." In schools, educators claimed that Bart was a "threat to learning" because of his "underachiever and proud of it" attitude and negative attitude regarding his education. Others described him as "egotistical, aggressive and mean-spirited." In response to the criticism, James L. Brooks said, "I'm very wary of television where everybody is supposed to be a role model, you don't run across that many role models in real life. Why should television be full of them?"

In 1990 William Bennett, who at the time was drug czar of the United States, visited a drug treatment center in Pittsburgh and upon noticing a poster of Bart remarked, "You guys aren't watching The Simpsons, are you? That's not going to help you any." When a backlash over the comment ensued, Bennett apologized, claiming he "was just kidding" and saying "I'll sit down with the little spike head. We'll straighten this thing out." In a 1991 interview, Bill Cosby described Bart as a bad role model for children, calling him "angry, confused, frustrated". In response, Matt Groening said, "That sums up Bart, all right. Most people are in a struggle to be normal. He thinks normal is very boring, and does things that others just wished they dare do." On January 27, 1992, then-President George H. W. Bush said, "We are going to keep on trying to strengthen the American family, to make American families a lot more like the Waltons and a lot less like the Simpsons." The writers rushed out a tongue-in-cheek reply in the form of a short segment which aired three days later before a rerun of "Stark Raving Dad" in which Bart replied, "Hey, we're just like the Waltons. We're praying for an end to the Depression, too."

Although there were many critics of the character, favorable comments came from several quarters. Columnist Erma Bombeck wrote, "Kids need to know that somewhere in this world is a contemporary who can pull off all the things they can only fantasize about, someone who can stick it to their parents once in a while and still be permitted to live." In 2003, Bart placed first in a poll of parents in the United Kingdom who were asked "which made-up character had the most influence" on children under 12 years old.

Commendations

In 1998, Time named Bart one of the 100 most important people of the 20th century. He was the only fictional character to make the list. He had previously appeared on the cover of the edition of December 31, 1990. He was also ranked No. 48 in TV Guides "50 Greatest TV Stars of All Time" in 1996 and both he and Lisa ranked No. 11 in TV Guide's "Top 50 Greatest Cartoon Characters of All Time" in 2002. In 2022, Paste writers claimed that Bart is the 26th best cartoon character of all time.

At the 44th Primetime Emmy Awards in 1992, Cartwright won a Primetime Emmy Award for Outstanding Voice-Over Performance for voicing Bart in the season three episode "Separate Vocations". She shared the award with five other voice actors from The Simpsons. Various episodes in which Bart is strongly featured have been nominated for Emmy Awards for Outstanding Animated Program, including "Radio Bart" in 1992, "Future-Drama" in 2005, "The Haw-Hawed Couple" in 2006 and "Homer's Phobia", which won the award in 1997. In 1995, Cartwright won an Annie Award for "Voice Acting in the Field of Animation" for her portrayal of Bart in an episode. In 2000, Bart and the rest of the Simpson family were awarded a star on the Hollywood Walk of Fame located at 7021 Hollywood Boulevard.

In 2014 Bart Simpson became the second mascot of Russian football club FC Zenit Saint Petersburg, wearing number 87 on his back (referring to the character's debut in 1987; the club's first mascot is a blue-maned lion).

Merchandising
Alongside T-shirts, Bart has been included in various other The Simpsons-related merchandise, including air fresheners, baseball caps, bumper stickers, cardboard standups, refrigerator magnets, key rings, buttons, dolls, posters, figurines, clocks, soapstone carvings, Chia Pets, bowling balls and boxer shorts. The Bart Book, a book about Bart's personality and attributes, was released in 2004. Other books include Bart Simpson's Guide to Life. The Simpsons and Philosophy: The D'oh! of Homer, which is not an official publication, includes a chapter analyzing Bart's character and comparing him to the "Nietzschean ideal".

Bart has appeared in other media relating to The Simpsons. He has appeared in every one of The Simpsons video games, including Bart vs. the World, Bart Simpson's Escape from Camp Deadly, Bart vs. the Space Mutants, Bart's House of Weirdness, Bart vs. The Juggernauts, Bartman Meets Radioactive Man, Bart's Nightmare, Bart & the Beanstalk and The Simpsons Game, released in 2007. Alongside the television series, Bart regularly appears in issues of Simpsons Comics, which were first published on November 29, 1993, and are still issued monthly, and also has his own series called Bart Simpson Comics which have been released since 2000. Bart also plays a role in The Simpsons Ride, launched in 2008 at Universal Studios Florida and Hollywood. Bart appears as a playable character in the toys-to-life video game Lego Dimensions, released via a "Fun Pack" packaged with a Gravity Sprinter accessory in November 2015.

Bart, and other The Simpsons characters, have appeared in numerous television commercials for Nestlé's Butterfinger candy bars from 1990 to 2001, with the slogan "Nobody better lay a finger on my Butterfinger!" Lisa would occasionally advertise it too. Matt Groening would later say that the Butterfinger advertising campaign was a large part of the reason why Fox decided to pick up the half-hour show. The campaign was discontinued in 2001, much to the disappointment of Cartwright. Bart has also appeared in commercials for Burger King and Ramada Inn. In 2001, Kellogg's launched a brand of cereal called "Bart Simpson Peanut Butter Chocolate Crunch", which was available for a limited time. Before the half-hour series went on the air, Matt Groening pitched Bart as a spokesperson for Jell-O. He wanted Bart to sing "J-E-L-L-O", then burp the letter O. His belief was that kids would try to do it the next day, but he was rejected.

On April 9, 2009, the United States Postal Service unveiled a series of five 44-cent stamps featuring Bart and the four other members of the Simpson family. They are the first characters, other than Sesame Street characters, to receive this accolade while the show is still in production. The stamps, designed by Matt Groening, were made available for purchase on May 7, 2009.

References

Bibliography

Further reading

External links
 Bart Simpson on IMDb

The Simpsons characters
Television characters introduced in 1987
Child characters in television
Male characters in animated series
Child characters in animated films
Animation controversies in television
Prank calling
Animated human characters
Comedy film characters
Television controversies in the United States
Fictional left-handed character
Fictional pranksters
Fictional tricksters
Fictional skateboarders
Characters created by Matt Groening
Fictional characters with attention deficit hyperactivity disorder
Fictional elementary school students
Fictional victims of domestic abuse
Fictional people from the 20th-century